Salahi (also Romanized as Şālaḥī) is a village in Meydavud Rural District, Meydavud District, Bagh-e Malek County, Khuzestan Province, Iran. At the 2006 census, its population was 406, in 85 families.

References 

Populated places in Bagh-e Malek County